Rohan Bopanna and Pablo Cuevas were the defending champions, but chose not to participate together. Bopanna played alongside Édouard Roger-Vasselin, but lost in the semifinals to Oliver Marach and Mate Pavić. Cuevas teamed up with Marcel Granollers, but lost in the quarterfinals to Bob and Mike Bryan.

The Bryan brothers went on to win the title, beating Marach and Pavić in the final, 7–6(7–5), 6–3.

Seeds
All seeds received a bye into the second round.

Draw

Finals

Top half

Bottom half

References

External links
 Main draw

Doubles